A rostral column is a type of victory column originating in ancient Greece and Rome, where they were erected to commemorate a naval military victory.  Its defining characteristic is the integrated prows or rams of ships, representing captured or destroyed enemy ships.  The name derives from the Latin rostrum meaning the bow of a naval vessel.

Rostral columns of the modern world include the Columbus Monument at Columbus Circle in New York City, and the paired Saint Petersburg Rostral Columns.

List of notable rostral columns

Ancient

 Columna Rostrata C. Duilii ("Rostral Column of Gaius Duilius"), celebrating the  naval Battle of Mylae (260 BC); formerly in the Roman Forum, some remnants of the inscription are now in the Capitoline Museum.

Modern

 the Grenville Column, monument to Royal Navy officer Thomas Grenville, on the grounds of Stowe House, Buckinghamshire, England (1749)
 one element of the Tripoli Monument, United States Naval Academy, Annapolis, Maryland (1808)
 twin rostral columns in the Place des Quinconces, Bordeaux (1829)
 Place de la Concorde, Paris (1836)
 Old Saint Petersburg Stock Exchange and Rostral Columns, Saint Petersburg, Russia (1881)
 monument to Wilhelm von Tegetthoff, Praterstern, Vienna (1886)
 Columbus Monument, New York City (1892)
 in the Grand Basin of the World's Columbian Exposition (razed), Chicago, Illinois (1893)
 in Grant Park along the Metra Electric railroad line, Chicago, Illinois (1927-29)
 Cunard War Memorial, Liverpool, England (1920)
 Rostral Column, Vladivostok (:ru:Ростральная колонна (Владивосток) in Russian) (1960)
 Rostral Columns, Union Station Plaza, Washington, DC

See also
 Rostra, the raised platforms in ancient Rome, also adorned with the beaks of captured warships, from which orations and pleadings were delivered

References

Other sources
 "Greek architecture" Encyclopædia Britannica, 1965

External links

Types of monuments and memorials
Stone monuments and memorials